Maurice Joseph John Connor (26 September 1877 – 1934) was an Irish footballer who played as an inside right at both club and international levels.

Early life
Maurice Joseph John Connor was born on 26 September 1877 in Philipstown, Ireland.

Career

Club career
Connor played professionally in The Football League for West Bromwich Albion, Walsall, Bristol City, Woolwich Arsenal and Blackpool. Connor also played in the Southern League for Brentford, New Brompton, Fulham and in the Lancashire Combination for Colne. Connor also played in Scotland for Dundee Fereday and Gordon Highlanders and in Wales for Treharris Athletic.

International career
Connor played at international level for Ireland, and participated at the 1903 British Home Championship.

References

External links
Profile at Arsenal F.C. official website

1877 births
1934 deaths
Date of death missing
Irish association footballers (before 1923)
Pre-1950 IFA international footballers
West Bromwich Albion F.C. players
Walsall F.C. players
Bristol City F.C. players
Arsenal F.C. players
Gillingham F.C. players
Brentford F.C. players
Fulham F.C. players
Blackpool F.C. players
Colne F.C. players
English Football League players
Association football inside forwards
Treharris Athletic Western F.C. players